Usermaatre Setepenamun Osorkon III Si-Ese was Pharaoh of Egypt in the 8th Century BC. He is the same person as the Crown Prince and High Priest of Amun Osorkon B, son of Takelot II by his Great Royal Wife Karomama II. Prince Osorkon B is best attested by his Chronicle—which consists of a series of texts documenting his activities at Thebes—on the Bubastite Portal at Karnak.  He later reigned as king Osorkon III in Upper Egypt for twenty-eight years after defeating the rival forces of Pedubast I/Shoshenq VI who had apparently resisted the authority of his father here. Osorkon ruled the last five years of his reign in coregency with his son, Takelot III, according to Karnak Nile Level Text No. 13. Osorkon III's formal titulary was long and elaborate: Usermaatre Setepenamun, Osorkon Si-Ese Meryamun, Netjer-Heqa-waset.

Accession
Osorkon III's precise accession date is unknown. Various Egyptologists have suggested it may have been from around the mid-790s BC to as late as 787 BC. The issue is complicated by the fact that Prince Osorkon B did not immediately declare himself king after his successful conquest of Thebes and defeat of Shoshenq VI. This is evidenced by the fact that he dated this seminal event to Year 39 of Shoshenq III rather than Year 1 of his reign. Osorkon III may, therefore, have waited for a minimum of one or two years before proclaiming himself as a Pharaoh of the Theban-based 23rd Dynasty. Osorkon may also have been motivated to defeat or pacify any remaining supporters of the Pedubast I/Shoshenq VI rival faction in other regions of Upper Egypt whether they were in Elephantine, the Western Desert Oasis region—where Pedubast I is monumentally attested—or elsewhere in order to consolidate his position. Hence, Year 1 of Osorkon III is likely equivalent to Year 1 or Year 2 of Shoshenq IV instead, rather than Year 39 of Shoshenq III.

Identity

Osorkon III is attested by numerous impressive donation stelae and stone blocks from Herakleopolis Magna through to Thebes. He is generally thought to have been a contemporary of the Lower Egyptian 22nd Dynasty kings, Shoshenq IV, Pami, and the first decade of Shoshenq V's reign. Osorkon III's chief wife was Queen Karoadjet but his second wife was named Tentsai. A stela of Prince Osorkon B calls his spouse Tent[...] with part of the name being lost. The latter name can be rendered as either Tentsai or Tentamun. Significantly, however, both men have a daughter called Shepenupet.

The document explicitly calls Osorkon III, the High Priest of Amun. Osorkon III, thus, was almost certainly the High Priest Osorkon B, who defeated his father's opponents at Thebes in Year 39 of Shoshenq III, as Leahy notes. 
The identification of HPA Osorkon with King Osorkon III was first proposed by David Rohl and Peter James in 1982 where they state the following:

This theory has now been accepted by many Egyptologists, including Jürgen von Beckerath, Karl Jansen-Winkeln, Gerard Broekman, and Aidan Dodson, among others, with the notable exception of Kenneth Kitchen. Aidan Dodson and Dyan Hilton sum up the evidence by noting:

Osorkon probably lived into his eighties, which explains why he appointed his son Takelot III as the junior coregent to the throne in his final years. He would have been in failing health by this time.  Osorkon III's coregency with Takelot III is the last attested royal coregency in ancient Egyptian history. Later dynasties from Nubia, Sais, and Persia all ruled Egypt with a single king on the throne.

Karnak Nile Level Texts No. 6 and 7, dated to Year 5 and 6 of Osorkon III, calls his mother the "Chief Queen Kamama Merymut." Similarly, Prince Osorkon B's mother was identified as Queen Ka<ra>mama Merymut II, wife of Takelot II. The slightly different renderings of this Queen's name almost certainly refers to the same person here: Osorkon B/III.

Consorts
According to Kenneth Kitchen, Osorkon III's chief consort, Queen Karoadjet, was the mother of Shepenupet I, the God's Wife and Divine Adoratrice of Amun, while his lesser wife Tentsai was the mother of Osorkon III's two sons: Takelot III and Rudamun. Shepenupet I outlived both her half-brothers as the serving God's Wife of Amun at Thebes and survived into the reign of the Nubian ruler, Shebitku, where she is depicted on the small temple Osiris-Heqa-djet in the Amun precinct of Karnak, which was partially decorated by this king.

References

Bibliography

 [article language is English]

8th-century BC Pharaohs
8th-century BC clergy
Pharaohs of the Twenty-third Dynasty of Egypt
Theban High Priests of Amun